The 1998 Ealing Council election took place on 7 May 1998 to elect members of Ealing London Borough Council in London, England. The whole council was up for election and the Labour party stayed in overall control of the council.

Background

Election result

Ward results

References

1998
1998 London Borough council elections